Oskar Fischer (14 July 1929 – 26 April 2003) was an Austrian footballer. He played in one match for the Austria national football team in 1956.

References

External links
 

1929 births
2003 deaths
Austrian footballers
Austria international footballers
Place of birth missing
Association football defenders
FK Austria Wien players